Flipotte is a 1920 French silent film directed by Jacques de Baroncelli. It is based on a novel by Henry Kistemaeckers

Cast
Gabriel Signoret ...  Flipotte 
Suzanne Bianchetti  
Andrée Brabant   
Jeanne Cheirel

External links 

1920 films
French silent films
French black-and-white films
Films directed by Jacques de Baroncelli
1920 drama films
French drama films
Silent drama films
1920s French films